The 2011–12 Sydney Sixers season was the club's inaugural season in the Big Bash League (BBL) as the league adopted city-based teams rather than the traditional state representative team format of previous years. This was to align itself with the structure of the Indian Premier League for the ongoing Champions League Twenty20 competition. The Sixers were the inaugural champions of the Big Bash League, thus earning the right to compete in the 2012 Champions League Twenty20 in October 2012. The Sixers went on to win this tournament in their first effort.

Players

Squad
Players with international caps are listed in bold.
Ages are given as of 16 December 2011, the date of the first match played during the tournament

Review
In an exciting time for the league with the introduction of city-based teams, the Sydney Sixers were chosen to host the first game of this new format. The game was played on December 16, 2011, at the historical Sydney Cricket Ground (SCG). The Sixers opponents were Brisbane Heat. After losing the toss, the Sixers were asked to field first. The Sixers bowlers did a capable job of restricting the Heat to 8/139 from their allotted 20 overs. Stuart MacGill showed his class, coming out of retirement for this tournament, to end with the best figures from a Sixers bowler with 2/21. The Sixers easily chased down the runs with 8 balls to spare. Skipper and opening batsmen Brad Haddin got the Sixers off to a flying start, scoring 76 from 59 balls, allowing Steve Smith and Moises Henriques to pick up the final runs for the Sixers. The batting performance from Haddin earned him the Player of the Match award.

The Sixers then traveled down to Hobart to meet the Hurricanes. The Hurricanes dominated the match and won by 42 runs. After scoring at 6-runs per over with the loss of one wicket after 10 overs, Phil Jaques and Travis Birt unleashed a flurry of boundaries and scoring shots to amass a 107 wicket partnership. This was broken by the ever-willing wicket-taker Mitchell Starc. The Hurricanes made 3/169 and this total was seemingly unreachable for the Sixers after losing some early wickets. A fantastic spell of seam bowling from cult-hero Rana Naved-ul-Hasan, including 4 wickets for 6 runs from 11 balls at the death was enough to kill of the game. Hurricanes top order batsmen Birt was named Player of the Match.

A return to the SCG brought a return to the winners' circle for the Sixers. A standout performance with the bat from West Indian import Dwayne Bravo assured the win for the Sixers. The Sixers won the toss, batted and scored 9/166 in their 20 overs. Melbourne Stars all-rounder David Hussey was their best with ball (2/25) and bat (42 runs), but his performance was not enough to get the Stars over the line. The Stars fell 2 runs short in an exciting run chase.

The Sixers then picked up three wins on the road against the Melbourne Renegades, Sydney Thunder and Adelaide Strikers before battling out a hard-fought win against the Perth Scorchers at home. After losing a couple of early wickets, a steadying partnership from Henriques and Maddinson followed. A fantastic exhibition of ball striking from Smith in his 51 from 25 balls boosted the Sixers run rate. The final two overs saw the Sixers lose 5 for 8 and bowled out for 176. In the end this was enough as the Scorchers failed to achieve the target by the narrowest of margins. The run chase began well with the Scorches 0/32 from the first four overs. Mitchell Starc then claimed three wickets in five balls with some magnificent swinging deliveries. A calming performance from Marcus North assured Perth of securing top spot on the ladder, needing only 151 runs to do so. With one over to go, Perth needed 13 runs for victory. Brett Lee was the bowler for the Sixers. After a one, four, one from the first three balls, Perth now needed seven runs from three balls. Lee bowled a dot ball as Nathan Coulter-Nile swung and missed a full ball outside off stump. Lee then bowled Coulter-Nile out, but the umpire called no-ball. Replays suggested it was a legal delivery. Lee's next delivery was a wide. In what probably should have been an unbeatable seven from the last ball, now became five from two balls. Coulter-Nile scored two runs off the next ball. The final ball saw Coulter-Nile drive to Steve Smith at long on and as the batsmen tried to make two runs for a draw the result was inevitable. Smith's throw was accurate to Lee, who was able to knock off the bails, running North out. The Scorchers fell one run short. The stunning spell of swing by Starc earned him the Player of the Match.

Big Bash League

Regular season

Ladder

Matches

Finals

Playoff tree

Matches

Champions League Twenty20
As winners of the 2011–12 Big Bash League season, the Sixers earned the right to compete in the 2012 Champions League Twenty20 tournament. Please see 2012–13 Sydney Sixers season#Champions League Twenty20 for more details.

References

External links
Official site

Sydney Sixers seasons